Eitel Friedrich III, Count of Hohenzollern (1494 – 15 January 1525 in Pavia) was Count of County of Hohenzollern from 1512 until his death.

Life 
Eitel Friedrich was a son of Count Eitel Friedrich II (1452–1512) from his marriage to Magdalena (1460 -1496), the daughter of Margrave Friedrich of Altmark.  Eitel Friedrich succeeded his father as Count of Hohenzollern in 1512.

In 1515, he married Johanna of Witthem (d. 1544), the daughter of Philip, Lord of Beersel and Boutersem.

Eitel Friedrich III was top councillor and great chamberlain to Emperor Maximilian I, which demonstrates that he, like his father before him, had excellent relations with the Habsburgs.  He was also Imperial Archchamberlain and captain of the Lordship of Hohenberg.

He died in Pavia in 1525; he may have been poisoned.  He was in Pavia to serve as captain of the Landsknecht regiment.  He was buried in the Basilica of San Pietro in Ciel d'Oro of Pavia.

Issue 
His marriage Eitel Friedrich had the following children:
 Karl I (1516–1576), his successor as Count of Hohenzollern, married in 1537 to Margravine Anna of Baden-Durlach (1512–1579)
 Ferfried (died young)
 Anna (d. 1574)
 Margaret (died young)
 Eitel Friedrich, (d. 1544), fell during the Siege of St. Dizier
 Felix Friedrich (d. 1550)
 Johanna (d. 1550), married in 1539 to Baron James III, Seneschal of Waldburg-Trauchburg (1512–1542)

Ancestry

References 
 Wolfgang Neugebauer: Die Hohenzollern. Anfänge, Landesstaat und monarchische Autokratie bis 1740, vol. 1, Stuttgart, Berlin and Cologne, 1996

External links 
 Entry at rootsweb.ancestry.com 
 Family tree of the Hohenzollern dynasty

Counts of Hohenzollern
House of Hohenzollern
1494 births
1525 deaths
16th-century German people